Grove House, in Oxford Road, Chorlton-on-Medlock, Manchester, is an early Victorian building, originally three houses, of 1838–40. It is a Grade II* listed building as of 18 December 1963.

Pevsner described it as "a large detached house set back from the street." The house is of "scored stucco on brick with a hipped slate roof. It has a round-headed central doorway with keystone and a fanlight with slender radiating tracery." It was first occupied by the university ca. 1952 and has had various uses since then, including as a student health centre.

Notes

References
 
 

Buildings at the University of Manchester
Health centers
Grade II* listed buildings in Manchester
Grade II* listed educational buildings